Judgement 2010 was a professional wrestling event promoted by DDT Pro-Wrestling (DDT). It took place on March 14, 2010, in Tokyo, Japan, at the Korakuen Hall. It was the fourteenth event under the Judgement name. The event aired domestically on Fighting TV Samurai.

Storylines
Judgement 2010 featured six professional wrestling matches that involved different wrestlers from pre-existing scripted feuds and storylines. Wrestlers portrayed villains, heroes, or less distinguishable characters in the scripted events that built tension and culminated in a wrestling match or series of matches.

Event
The first match was Kazuki Hirata's DDT debut in which he failed to defend the Ironman Heavymetalweight Championship against Keisuke Ishii.

The third match was the "Tiger Toguchi Challenge Handicap Match" where he and Hoshitango took on the team of Tomomitsu Matsunaga, Gota Ihashi and Soma Takao.

In the next match, Harashima faced Togi Makabe from New Japan Pro-Wrestling.

Next was the "KO-D Openweight Championship Contendership & Right To Challenge Anytime, Anywhere + α Contention Rumble", a Rumble rules match in which the winner would receive a title match against the KO-D Openweight Champion on April 4 at a Shinjuku Face live event. Additionally, five envelopes were suspended above the ring. Each envelope had a symbol printed on it (Clubs, Hearts, Spades, Diamonds or Skull and Crossbones) and contained a prize. The prizes included a one-day date with joshi wrestler , a one-day date with idol and model Aika Ando, a one-year DDT contract, the right to become DDT's CEO and the Right To Challenge Anytime, Anywhere contract, giving the right to their holder to challenge for any title at any moment in the next year. Whenever someone grabbed an envelope, all the participants still in the match had to freeze until the prize that had just been won was announced. Failing to do so resulted in a disqualification. Grabbing an envelope also resulted in being eliminated from the match.

Results

KO-D Openweight Championship Contendership & Right To Challenge Anytime, Anywhere + α Contention Rumble

Footnotes

References

External links
The official DDT Pro-Wrestling website

2010
2010 in professional wrestling
Professional wrestling in Tokyo